Abdullaev is a Slavic masculine surname, commonly found in Russia, Caucasia, and Central Asian. The female counterpart surname is Abdullaeva. 

Variants of this surname include Abdalin/Abdalina (/), Abdulin/Abdulina (/), Abdullayev/Abdullayeva (/), Abdullin/Abdullina (/), Abdulov/Abdulova (/), Babdulin/Babdulina (/), and Babdullin/Babdullina (/). All these surnames slavicised from various forms of the given name Abdullah (Abdulla), which itself is derived from Arabic "abd allāh", meaning god's servant or god's slave. People with the name Abdullaev include:
 Gulomjon Abdullaev (born 1998), Uzbekistani freestyle wrestler
 Mahammatkodir Abdullaev (born 1973), Uzbekistani boxer
 Muhammad Abdullaev (born 1973), Uzbekistani boxer
 Muminjon Abdullaev (born 1989), Uzbekistani Greco-Roman wrestler
 Nazir Abdullaev (born 1991), Russian Greco-Roman wrestler
 Rihsitilla Abdullaev (born 1978), Uzbek actor
 Rustam Abdullaev (born 1971), Uzbekistani association football player and coach
 Sadriddin Abdullaev (born 1986), Uzbekistani association football player
 Saidullo Abdullaev (born 1965), Uzbekistani businessperson
 Shamshad Abdullaev (born 1957), Soviet-Uzbek poet and writer
 Shokhrullo Abdullaev, Uzbek singer, composer, actor
 Zaur Abdullaev (born 1994), Russian professional boxer

See also 
 Abdulayev
 Abdullayev
 Abdulov
 Abdulin
 Abdullin

References

Notes

Sources
И. М. Ганжина (I. M. Ganzhina). "Словарь современных русских фамилий" (Dictionary of Modern Russian Last Names). Москва, 2001. 

Masculine surnames
Patronymic surnames
Azerbaijani-language surnames
Kazakh-language surnames
Kyrgyz-language surnames
Russian-language surnames
Tajik-language surnames
Turkmen-language surnames
Uzbek-language surnames
Surnames of Uzbekistani origin